Free Painters and Sculptors (FPS) is an artist-led organisation based in London, England, which regularly exhibits every year. It played a pivotal role in the establishment of abstract art in the 1950s and 1960s.

History

Background 

FPS was founded in 1952 by a number of members of the ICA who wanted to create their own painting group. Known initially as 'Painters Group from the ICA', the idea of freedom was one of the group's core beliefs. In the aftermath of World War II it was vital for the group to be able to stand for principles of artistic freedom and each artist was free to express themselves however they chose. Artists with a 'modern approach' were welcomed, generally falling into abstract or figurative camps.

Formative Years 

The first exhibition was held at the end of 1953 in the Three Arts Centre, Great Cumberland Place and was opened by art critic John Berger. Twenty six artists exhibited.

Soon after this the group was renamed the 'Free Painters Group' and annual exhibitions followed in Walker's Galleries on New Bond Street. There were also satellite exhibitions in the New Vision Centre Gallery on Seymour Place, Marble Arch and the Drian Gallery on Porchester Place, Bayswater.

These three galleries were early natural homes for the group: The Walker's Galleries had been the location of the first exhibition of the Seven and Five Society - a natural predecessor of the Free Painters Group; New Vision Centre Gallery was run by members Denis Bowen, Halima Nalecz and Frank Avray Wilson and was a hub for the avant-garde and experimental. Halima Nalecz also ran the Drian Gallery and many exhibitions were held there by members over the years.

Middle Years 

In the early 1960s the group began to stage exhibitions at the FBA Galleries in Suffolk Street, Pall Mall. This larger venue was well suited to the growing number of members and also was able to house larger works that were created.

With this increasing membership and more sculptors in the group, in 1965 'Free Painters Group' was renamed to its current name of 'Free Painters and Sculptors'. Also at this time, FPS became a registered charity.

Exhibitions were gathering more interest and garnered reviews in local and national press. As well as an annual exhibition (now branded 'Trends'), many members staged exhibitions around the UK as well as overseas.

In the early 1970s a desire to find venues aside from the annual exhibition was facilitated by the then-secretary of the group Nina Hosali. Nina's mother Kate Hosali had founded the Society for Protection of Animals in North Africa (SPANA) in 1923 and the headquarters were at their home at 15 Buckingham Gate. The property was used by the free painters for meetings and storage space and in 1972 the loggia in its gardens was turned into a permanent gallery space - the Loggia Gallery and Sculpture Garden.

In 1973 'Trends' moved to the Mall Galleries, Pall Mall and exhibited there until the next decade.

Membership by the mid 1970s had grown rapidly and was at a peak of nearly 500.

Later Years 

The 1980s saw the group achieve a milestone of 30 years but the period saw challenges. The group had healthy number of members but had to work hard to ensure that quality remained high. In addition, founding members were reaching old age and retirement and their loss was felt. Lastly, societal changes meant whereas the group had always been London focussed, it had to look outwards as artists left London.

However, these challenges created interesting opportunities whereby exhibitions outside of London were staged and new blood was found. A new generation of artists joined the ranks and thus kept the group relevant and vital. Exhibitions continued to be held at the London venue of the Loggia Gallery although other suitable venues in London were harder and increasingly expensive to come by.

Modern Era 

FPS celebrated its 65th anniversary in 2017. It currently has over 50 members, both from the UK and overseas. Membership is granted by election of the Executive Committee on the submission of acceptable samples of work.

FPS exhibits at least twice year in London, most recently at the Menier Gallery and the gallery at the Oxo Tower. An annual Open exhibition celebrates the work of members alongside selected work chosen from artist submissions.

Members 
The following is a select list of notable members of the group throughout its lifetime.

 Anthea Alley
 Aubrey Williams 
 Cecil Stephenson
 Cliff Holden
 Denis Bowen
 Dorothy Bordass 
 E. L. T. Mesens 
 Frank Avray Wilson 
 John Pelling
 John Coplans 
 Kathleen Guthrie 
 Leslie Marr
 Otway McCannell
 Roderick Barrett
 Roy Turner Durrant
 Violet Fuller
 Witold Kawalec

References

External links 
 Official website
 FPS Exhibition Timeline

Organizations established in 1952
Cultural organisations based in London
Arts in London
British artist groups and collectives
Arts organizations established in 1952
1952 establishments in England